The following is a list of the most extreme temperatures ever recorded in Greece.

According to the World Meteorological Organization, Greece holds the official record for the highest temperature in Europe, with 48.0 °C in Elefsina and Tatoi, which are located in the Athens metropolitan area.

Highest temperatures

Lowest temperatures

References

Weather events in Greece
Weather extremes of Earth
Lists of extreme temperatures